Mass media in Finland includes a variety of online, print, and broadcast formats, such as radio, television, newspapers, and magazines.

Magazines

Newspapers

Åbo Underrättelser newspaper began publication in 1824.

Radio

Yleisradio Oy began in 1926.

Television

See also
 Telecommunications in Finland
 Internet in Finland
 Cinema of Finland
 Censorship in Finland

References

Bibliography

External links
 
 

 
Finland
Finland